Cordwainers' Hall was the livery hall of the Worshipful Company of Cordwainers, the City of London livery company for Cordwainers (workers in fine leather) from 1316 until its destruction in 1941.

The hall stood in St. Paul's Churchyard, facing Cannon Street. Five successive halls were built on the site, the last three were rebuilt in 1670, 1788, and 1910. A plaque marks the site. The 1788 hall was built by Sylvanus Hall, with the front of the hall decorated in stone by Robert Adam. The front of the hall featured a stone medallion of a "country girl spinning with a distaff...and of the thread of cordwainers or shoemakers." The arms of the Cordwainers company was in the pediments of the building.

The hall was destroyed during World War II in the London blitz, on 10–11 May 1941.

References

1316 establishments in England
Buildings and structures in the United Kingdom destroyed during World War II
Former buildings and structures in the City of London
Livery halls